Billy Ray can refer to:
 Billy Ray (screenwriter), American screenwriter and director

Billy Ray is also the given name of:
 Billy Ray Barnes, American football player
 Billy Ray Brown, American golfer
 Billy Ray Cyrus, American country musician and actor
 Billy Ray Hamilton, American convicted murderer
 Billie Ray Martin, German female singer
 Billy Ray Smith (disambiguation)
 Billy Ray Waldon, Native American activist

See also 
 Bill Ray (disambiguation)
 William Ray (disambiguation)
 Billy Rayner, Australian rugby league footballer
 Billy Reay, Canadian hockey player